is a former Japanese football player.

Playing career
Fujikawa was born in Kanagawa Prefecture on May 1, 1964. After graduating from Hosei University, he joined Toyota Motors in 1987. He became a regular player as defensive midfielder and center back. In 1995, he moved to JEF United Ichihara. However his opportunity to play decreased and he retired end of 1996 season.

Club statistics

References

External links

1964 births
Living people
Hosei University alumni
Association football people from Kanagawa Prefecture
Japanese footballers
Japan Soccer League players
J1 League players
Nagoya Grampus players
JEF United Chiba players
Association football midfielders